The Siberian lynx (Lynx lynx wrangeli), also known as the East Siberian lynx, is a subspecies of Eurasian lynx living in the Russian Far East. It lives in the Stanovoy Range and east of the Yenisei River. There were 5,890 mature individuals in the Russian Far East as of 2013. Prey include the Siberian roe deer. The Siberian lynx is the second most common subspecies of the Eurasian lynx. According to a study done on the mortality of Eurasian lynx, the Siberian lynx lives to an average age of 15 years.

See also
 Caucasian lynx

References

Eurasian lynx subspecies
Mammals described in 1928
Mammals of Asia
Mammals of Russia
Fauna of Siberia